Six flats may refer to:
G-flat major, a major musical key with six flats
E-flat minor, a minor musical key with six flats
Flat-six engine, a type of piston engine